Hvoyna Cove (‘Zaliv Hvoyna’ \'za-liv 'hvoy-na\) is the 1.7 km wide cove indenting for 1 km Davis Coast in Graham Land, Antarctica. It is part of Jordanoff Bay entered east of Wennersgaard Point and west of Kamenar Point. The cove is named after the settlement of Hvoyna in Southern Bulgaria.

Location
German-British mapping in 1996.

Maps
 Trinity Peninsula. Scale 1:250000 topographic map No. 5697. Institut für Angewandte Geodäsie and British Antarctic Survey, 1996.
 Antarctic Digital Database (ADD). Scale 1:250000 topographic map of Antarctica. Scientific Committee on Antarctic Research (SCAR). Since 1993, regularly upgraded and updated.

References
 Bulgarian Antarctic Gazetteer. Antarctic Place-names Commission. (details in Bulgarian, basic data in English)
 Hvoyna Cove. SCAR Composite Antarctic Gazetteer

External links
 Hvoyna Cove. Copernix satellite image

Coves of Graham Land
Davis Coast
Bulgaria and the Antarctic